The BRP Teresa Magbanua (MRRV-9701) is the lead ship of her class of patrol vessels operated by the Philippine Coast Guard (PCG). The service officially classifies her as a multi-role response vessel (MRRV). She is one of the largest, and most modern vessels of the PCG. She is named after Teresa Magbanua, a Filipino schoolteacher who participated in all three resistance movements in Philippine history: against Spain (in the Philippine Revolution), the United States (in the Philippine–American War), and Japan (in World War II).

Construction and design
She was constructed by Mitsubishi Shipbuilding Co. Ltd in Shimonoseki, Japan based on the  Kunigami-class patrol vessels. The contract was under the "Maritime Safety Capability Improvement Project Phase 2" project of the Department of Transportation in 2016. The deal was worth 14.55 billion yen for two units from a JICA STEP Loan of 16.455 billion yen and was signed on February 7, 2020.

The vessel has a length of 96.6 meters, a maximum speed of not less than 24 knots, and has a complement of 67 officers and crew members. She is powered by two 6600 kW diesel engines. She has a helideck, and a hangar that can accommodate the H145T2 helicopter of the PCG. She also has a hyperbaric chamber for those who have diving sickness and a survivor room that can accommodate those who will be rescued.

The first steel cutting ceremony happened on 18th of December 2020. She was launched on 26th of July 2021. The vessel underwent sea trials conducted by the shipbuilder and the PCG in late 2021. She arrived in Manila on 28th of February 2022.

History
On Friday, 6th of May 2022, a bottle of wine was broken on the hull of the vessel as part of the commissioning ceremony led by the Philippine Coast Guard. During the ceremony, Transportation Secretary Arthur Tugade highlighted how the newest addition to the PCG fleet would boost its capability to perform “humanitarian” missions and address its “safety concerns and commitments” in Philippine waters.

References 

Ships of the Philippine Coast Guard
Ships built by Mitsubishi Heavy Industries
2021 ships